Tiffany is a fictional character in Todd McFarlane's Spawn comic book series. She was first introduced to the series in issues #44 and #45. Tiffany, like fellow angel Angela, is a Hellspawn hunter.  Therefore, the most current Hellspawn, Al Simmons, is her primary target.  She has a long-standing rivalry with Angela, but since Angela has gone rogue, Tiffany's aim is to fill her place as the top Hellspawn slayer in Heaven's army. In her first attempt to slay Spawn, she was over-zealous and was defeated in a grisly manner.  Although she lost the fight, she escaped with her life, since the still inexperienced Spawn did not realize that merely destroying an angel's physical body is not enough to truly kill it. She has not appeared in the comic since.

Costume
Tiffany's costume includes gauntlets that can be used to contact others with similar technology via a hinged screen, completely concealing it while in battle. Her right boot is wide at the base and tapering to the knee. From a brown leather belt dangles hooks and pouches. Tiffany wears a tight violet bikini.

In other media

Tiffany (called Tiffany of the Amazoni) is a featured character in the online comic The Adventures of Spawn.  In this animation-style reimagination of the Spawn mythos, Tiffany takes a much greater role in the story, being cited as one of Heaven's most illustrious and honored warriors.

Tiffany is a playable character in the video game Spawn: In the Demon's Hand, voiced by Alyson Court.

References

Comics characters introduced in 1996
Spawn characters
Fictional angels
Fictional women soldiers and warriors
Characters created by Todd McFarlane
Image Comics female supervillains
Mythology in comics